Greensleeves Rhythm Album #40: Egyptian is an album in Greensleeves Records' rhythm album series.  It was released in May 2003 on CD and LP.  The album features various artists recorded over the "Egyptian" riddim produced by Daniel "Blaxx" Lewis and Donovan "Vendetta" Bennett.

Track listing
"Sweet To The Belly" - Vybz Kartel
"Get With It Girl" - Sean Paul
"Egyptian Dance" - Elephant Man
"It's A Girl Thing" - Assassin
"I Will Love The Girls" - Wayne Marshall
"Warlord Vex" - Bounty Killer
"Coulda Wha" - T.O.K.
"Sake A Dat Gal" - Kid Kurrupt
"These Are The Days" - Sizzla
"Pure Gal" - Bling Dawg
"Hotties" - Degree
"Gal Yuh Nah" - Buccaneer
"Tek Them On" - Junior Kelly
"Just For Girls" - Regan
"Grind It Off" - Frisco Kid
"Girls In Girls Out" - Ward 21 & Determine
"Get Up Nuh" - Madd Anju
"Clean It Up" - Spragga Benz & Brigadiere
"Draw Wi Out" - Looga Man & Mossy Kid
"Egyptian Rhythm" - Donovan "Vendetta" Bennett

2003 compilation albums
Reggae compilation albums
Greensleeves Records albums